Aix-Noulette is a commune in the Pas-de-Calais department in the Hauts-de-France region of France.

Geography
Junction 6.1 of the A26 autoroute is within the borders of the commune.

Population

Sights
 The church of St. Germain, dating from the 13th century.
 The feudal motte.
 Remains of a medieval castle.
 The three Commonwealth War Graves Commission cemeteries.

See also
Communes of the Pas-de-Calais department
 The Église Saint-Germain d’Aix-Noulette has Georges Saupique statues of St Barbara and St Nicholas.

References

External links

 Aix-Noulette Communal Cemetery Extension - CWGC cemetery
 Bois de Noulette British Cemetery - CWGC cemetery
  Tranchee de Mecknes Cemetery   - CWGC cemetery
 Website of the Communaupole de Lens-Liévin 

Communes of Pas-de-Calais
Artois